Oziidae is a family of crabs in the order Decapoda. There are about 7 genera and more than 30 described species in Oziidae.

Genera
These seven genera belong to the family Oziidae:
 Baptozius Alcock, 1898
 Bountiana N.g.Davie, 2000
 Epixanthoides Balss, 1935
 Epixanthus Heller, 1861
 Eupilumnus Kossmann, 1877
 Lydia Gistel, 1848
 Ozius Milne-Edwards, 1834

References

Further reading

 
 
 

Decapods
Decapod families